Marcus Hinsman "Mark" Barnum (March 14, 1834 – July 31, 1904) was an American lawyer, businessman, and politician.

Born in Syracuse, New York, Barnum moved to Rosendale, Wisconsin in 1855 and taught school. He then moved to Wausau, Wisconsin, in 1858, was admitted to the Wisconsin bar, and elected District Attorney of Marathon County, Wisconsin in 1857 and in 1872. During the American Civil War, he served in the Union Army. After the war, he published a newspaper, The Torch of Liberty, and owned a summer hotel. Barnum was convicted of libel in 1896 and served part of a prison sentence, but was then pardoned. Barnum served in the Wisconsin State Assembly in 1897 and was a Republican. He died in Wausau, Wisconsin.

Notes

External links

1834 births
1904 deaths
Lawyers from Syracuse, New York
Politicians from Wausau, Wisconsin
People of Wisconsin in the American Civil War
Businesspeople from Wisconsin
Editors of Wisconsin newspapers
Wisconsin lawyers
Republican Party members of the Wisconsin State Assembly
Journalists from New York (state)
Politicians from Syracuse, New York
19th-century American politicians
19th-century American businesspeople